Deh-e Lulu (also Romanized as Deh-e Lūlū; also known as Deh Lo’lo’ and Lo’lo’) is a village in Derakhtengan Rural District, in the Central District of Kerman County, Kerman Province, Iran. At the 2006 census, its population was 307, in 83 families.

References 

Populated places in Kerman County